Pantydia dufayi is a species of moth of the family Erebidae. It is found in Kenya.

References

Moths described in 1975
Pantydia
Moths of Africa